There are two species of snake named brown ground snake:
 Atractus major
 Atractus arangoi